Analade is a village in the Saint-Louis-du-Sud commune of the Aquin Arrondissement, in the Sud department of Haiti.

References

Populated places in Sud (department)